The Inverclyde Group is a Carboniferous lithostratigraphic group (a sequence of rock strata) in southern Scotland and northernmost England. The name is derived from Inverclyde. The rocks of the Inverclyde Group have also previously been referred to as the Cementstone Group and Stirling Group. The group comprises sandstones with limestones and dolomites and some mudstone and lesser amounts of siltstone.

References

 

Carboniferous System of Europe
Geology of England
Geology of Scotland
Geological groups of the United Kingdom
Geologic formations of the United Kingdom